Kastriot is a village and a former municipality in the Dibër County, northeastern Albania. At the 2015 local government reform it became a subdivision of the Dibër Municipality. The population at the 2011 census was 6,200.

References

Former municipalities in Dibër County
Administrative units of Dibër (municipality)
Villages in Dibër County